The C0299 RNA family consists of a group of Shigella flexneri and Escherichia coli RNA genes which are 78 bases in length and are found between the hlyE and umuD genes. The function of this RNA is unknown.

See also 
C0343 RNA
C0465 RNA
C0719 RNA

References

External links 
 

Non-coding RNA